Eldenburg Lübz is an Amt in the Ludwigslust-Parchim district, in Mecklenburg-Vorpommern, Germany. The seat of the Amt is in Lübz.

The Amt Eldenburg Lübz consists of the following municipalities:

References

Ämter in Mecklenburg-Western Pomerania